Hank Woon (born February 23, 1978, in Olympia, Washington) is an American fiction author, game designer and screenwriter.

Early life
Hank Woon was born in Olympia, Washington and raised in Aberdeen, Washington, and attended Aberdeen-Weatherwax High School.

Career
Hank Woon began freelancing in 2003 with an adventure for the popular tabletop role-playing game Dungeons & Dragons in Dungeon Magazine #97 by Paizo Publishing. In 2004, he joined RedBrick LLC's development team as writer, editor, and developer for Earthdawn Classic (and offered his editing services for a few Fading Suns 2nd edition projects as well). In 2008, his first novel, Dark Shadows of Yesterday, was published by RedBrick LLC.

In 2008, Hank moved to Renton, WA and in early 2009, still working with RedBrick, joined their development teams for Earthdawn 3rd Edition as well as Age of Legend 4E, and was also hired onto the Paizo Publishing staff as an editorial intern. He has written several adventures, articles, and sourcebooks for the Earthdawn, Age of Legend, and Pathfinder Roleplaying Game lines, including writing contributions to the Pathfinder Roleplaying Game Core Rulebook.

In August 2009, Hank's tenure as an editorial intern with Paizo Publishing ended, though he continued to contribute to Pathfinder by freelancing for Paizo, as well as other third-party publishers who supported the game. (Hank also left his permanent mark with the Pathfinder Society, as his handwriting is immortalized as the signature of Muhlia al-Jakri at the back of every adventure in the faction handouts, and also statted Paizo's mascot, the Golem.) In addition, he joined RedBrick's Equinox gameline as a developer and writer the same month.

In September 2009, his second Earthdawn novel, Immortal Twilight, was published by RedBrick LLC. The same month, Adamant Entertainment debuted its Pathfinder-compatible monster series, Fell Beasts, of which Hank was one of the authors. They also announced Warpath, a game supplement designed by Hank featuring rules for mass combat for the Pathfinder Roleplaying Game system, released in May 2010.

In July 2010, Chronicles: Pathfinder Podcast featured an interview with Hank, discussing his work on Warpath, and two of his other Pathfinder works, Sniper in the Deep and Terror at Whistledown.
 
In November 2012, Hank Woon appeared on Camouflaj's podcast, Camouflaj Radio, to discuss his career in the tabletop roleplaying game industry, as well as his work as a merchandise developer with The Pokémon Company International, and working alongside well-known Dungeons & Dragons game designer Wolfgang Baur.

In April 2013, it was announced that Hank Woon would be penning an original script for The Asylum called Age of Dinosaurs, for director Joseph J. Lawson. This marked Woon's third straight-to-DVD feature.

In October 2014, it was announced that Hank Woon would be co-writing the live-action script for It Came from the Desert with Finnish director Marko Mäkilaakso, based on the cult classic video game by Cinemaware. It was also announced that Woon was hired to rewrite a script titled "Night of the Witch" by Roger!Pictures, to be directed by Finnish director Marko Mäkilaakso. The rewrite was based on an original script written by Loyd Kaufman and Stan Lee.

In February 2017, it was announced that Woon would be co-writing a script titled Savage with director/producer Daniel Zirilli and actor/writer Johnny Strong, to be directed by William Kaufman.

In May 2017, an animated series on HitRecord titled USAI: The Complete Animated Series was released on HitRecord.org, of which Woon was a contributing writer.

In July 2017, it was announced that Woon would be writing a new anthology series titled "Future Sex" for French digital media studio Blackpills.

Variety and Deadline reported in October 2017 that Woon penned an adaptation of Don Roff's thriller Snowblind, with Marcus Alqueres attached to direct, and starring Karl Urban, Ashley Greene, and Forrest Goodluck.

On February 23, 2021 both Variety and Deadline reported that Netflix picked up an original screenplay written by Woon titled Gordon Hemingway & The Realm of Cthulhu, which will be produced by Spike Lee and directed by Stefon Bristol, with Jonathan Majors in the title role.

Bibliography

Filmography

References

External links
Hank Woon on IMDB
Kobold Press Interview
Pathfinder Profile

1978 births
American fiction writers
Living people
Role-playing game designers
Writers from Aberdeen, Washington
People from Aberdeen, Washington